The Globe KD6G Firefly is an American target drone, built by the Globe Aircraft Corporation for operation by the United States Navy during the 1950s and early 1960s.

Design and development
The design of the KD6G was based on the earlier Globe KD2G Firefly target drone, featuring a mid-wing configuration with a twin-fin empennage, but instead of a pulsejet powerplant as in the KD2G the KD6G was fitted with a single piston engine in a tractor configuration. Launched via catapult, the KD6G was radio-controlled during flight, and, if it was not shot down in the course of its mission, would be recovered via parachute.

Operational history
First flying in prototype form in 1951, the KD6G proved successful and was ordered into production in two forms, the KD6G-1 with a McCullough O-100 engine, and the KD6G-2 with a Kiekhaefer V-105 powerplant. Used extensively by the United States Navy during the 1950s in the gunnery training role, the KD6G-2 was redesignated in 1963 in the new unified missile sequence, becoming the MQM-40A before being retired soon thereafter.

Variants
 XKD6G-1
 Prototype with McCullogh O-100-1 engine
 KD6G-1
 Production version of XKD6G-1
 KD6G-2
 Production version with Kiekhaefer V-105-2 engine
 XQM-40A
 Initial redesignation of KD6G-2
 MQM-40A
 Final redesignation of KD6G-2

Aircraft on display
A KD6G-2 is on display at the Pima Air & Space Museum; another is at the Planes of Fame Air Museum.

Specifications (KD6G-2)

See also

References

Citations

Bibliography

KD6G
1940s United States special-purpose aircraft
Target drones of the United States
Single-engined tractor aircraft
Mid-wing aircraft
Aircraft first flown in 1951
Twin-tail aircraft